Cymothoe egesta, the common yellow glider, is a butterfly in the family Nymphalidae. It is found in Sierra Leone, Liberia, Ivory Coast, Ghana, Nigeria, Cameroon, Gabon, the Republic of the Congo, the Central African Republic, the Democratic Republic of the Congo, Uganda and Tanzania. The habitat consists of lowland to sub-montane forests, including secondary growth.

Males mud-puddle and both sexes are attracted to fermenting fruit. They have also been recorded feeding from the flowers of Cleistopholis patens.

The larvae feed on Rinorea species.

Subspecies
Cymothoe egesta egesta (Sierra Leone, Liberia, Ivory Coast, Ghana to western Nigeria)
Cymothoe egesta confusa Aurivillius, 1887 (Nigeria: Cross River loop, Cameroon, Gabon, Congo, Central African Republic, Democratic Republic of the Congo, western Uganda, north-western Tanzania)

Gallery

References

Butterflies described in 1775
Cymothoe (butterfly)
Taxa named by Pieter Cramer